René-Marie Madec (February 7, 1736 – 1784), called Medoc in Anglo-Indian writings, was a French adventurer in India.

Madec was born at Quimper in Brittany of poor parents.

Aged twelve, he embarked as ship's boy on a boat from Lorient heading for the island of Hispaniola (present day Dominican Republic). From there, he embarked for Pondichéry, French trading post in India. Madec lived there for about twenty five years, sometimes French corsair, sometimes British corsair. He became soldier under Joseph François Dupleix and sergeant under Lally-Tollendal. Being taken prisoner by the British, he enlisted in the Bengal army. Deserting with some of his companions shortly before the battle of Buxar (1764), he became military instructor to various native princes, organizing successively the forces of Shuja-ud-Dowlah, Nawab of Oudh, and of the Jats and Rohillas.

In 1772 he took service under the Mughal emperor Shah Alam II, who gave him the title of Nawab, reserved to the highest dignitaries of the sultan's court. When that prince was defeated at Delhi by the Mahrattas, Madec rejoined his own countrymen in Puducherry, where he took an active part in the defence of the town (1778). He became King of the Deccan, defender of the Indies for the King of France and he accumulated great wealth.

After the capitulation of Puducherry, in 1779, he returned to France with a considerable fortune. The King appointed him Colonel and named him Chevalier de Saint Louis. He then settled in Quimper, at the number 5 of the street which nowadays bears his name, not far from his birth-house. He lived a fabulous life until a bad fall off a horse in 1784. He died soon thereafter. He is buried in the graveyard at Penhars.

At one time he formed a scheme of a French alliance with the Mughal emperor against the British, but the project came to nothing.

References

1736 births
1784 deaths
People from Quimper
18th-century French military personnel
19th-century French people
Deaths by horse-riding accident in France